Vata Matanu Garcia (born 19 March 1961), known simply as Vata, is a retired Angolan footballer who played as a striker.

He spent most of his professional career in Portugal, most notably at Benfica.

Club career
Born in Damba, Uíge Province, Vata started his football career at Progresso Associação do Sambizanga. After a good run in Portugal with Varzim SC, he caught the eye of Primeira Liga club S.L. Benfica, signing with them for 1988–89 and being crowned the season's top scorer in his first year.

In the following campaign's European Cup campaign, Vata achieved his most (in)famous moment: after the 1–2 defeat at Olympique de Marseille in the semifinals, he scored from a left-side corner kick, putting the ball in the net with his right arm as Benfica won on the away goals rule with that single goal.

After two more seasons in Portugal, with C.F. Estrela da Amadora and S.C.U. Torreense, 38-year-old Vata retired in 1999 after spells with Malta's Floriana Football Club and Gelora Dewata and Persija Jakarta (Indonesia, where he also would act as player-coach). In 1993–94 he also had a brief go at Futsal, in the United States.

As a full-time manager, Vata worked with Guntur Bali, winning the league in his only season and also coaching in that country Mitra Kukar F.C. and Kalimantan (in 2004–05). He also worked at the International School in Bali in 2000 and at the European Football Institute in Australia, as a high-performance coach of both the senior and reserve teams.

International career
Vata was capped 65 times for the Angolan national team, including one 1990 FIFA World Cup qualifying match.

Honours

Club
Benfica
Portuguese League: 1988–89, 1990–91
Portuguese Supercup: 1986
European Cup: Runner-up 1989–90

Floriana
Maltese Cup: 1993–94

Deltras
Indonesian League: 1999–2000 (as coach)

Individual
Portuguese League: Top Scorer 1988–89 (16 goals)
Indonesian League: Top Scorer 1995–96

References

External links

Bali Beach Soccer bio

1961 births
Living people
People from Cunene Province
Angolan footballers
Association football forwards
Girabola players
Progresso Associação do Sambizanga players
Primeira Liga players
Liga Portugal 2 players
Varzim S.C. players
S.L. Benfica footballers
C.F. Estrela da Amadora players
S.C.U. Torreense players
Maltese Premier League players
Floriana F.C. players
Liga 1 (Indonesia) players
Deltras F.C. players
Angola international footballers
Angolan expatriate footballers
Expatriate footballers in Portugal
Expatriate footballers in Malta
Expatriate footballers in Indonesia
Angolan expatriate sportspeople in Portugal
Angolan football managers